John Prophet (died 1416), was Dean of Hereford and York.

John Prophet may also refer to:

John Prophet (MP died 1416), see City of London (elections to the Parliament of England)
John Prophet (MP died c.1399), MP for Hereford
John the Prophet, known also as Venerable John